Chak 233 GB Kot Barseer  is located net to Chak 234 GB in Tehsil Jaranwala district Faisalabad, Pakistan. There is one primary school for girls and a middle school for boys in the village. Near by rail station Panj Pulla on Shorkot–Sheikhupura Branch Line

This village is far from main Jaranwala-Nankana Road. There is daily bus service from Jaranwala to 233 GB via 236 GB.

See also
Government Islamia High School Jaranwala

References

Villages in Faisalabad District